Dance Band is a 1935 British musical film directed by Marcel Varnel and starring Charles "Buddy" Rogers, June Clyde and Steven Geray. It was shot at Welwyn Studios with sets designed by the art director David Rawnsley.

Plot
When dance band leader Buddy Milton (Charles 'Buddy' Rogers) competes in a contest with a female orchestra, he falls in love with its leader, Pat Shelley (June Clyde). Intense rivalry between the two bands and the machinations of a crooked business manager (Fred Duprez), serve as romantic obstacles along the way.

Cast
 Charles "Buddy" Rogers as Buddy Milton
 June Clyde as Pat Shelley
 Steven Geray as Steve Sarel
 Magda Kun as Anna
 Fred Duprez as Lewis
 Albert Whelan as Tommy Bourne
 Sybil Jason as Little Girl On Train
 Hal Gordon as Spike
 Fred Groves as Pantomime Act
 Leon Sherkot as Jim
 Richard Hearne as Acrobatic Drunk
 Jack Holland as Dancer at Club
 June Hart as Dancer at Club

Critical reception
The New York Times wrote, "In "Dance Band," the new film at the Fox Theatre in Brooklyn, Charles (Buddy) Rogers resumes the boyish smile and mannerisms that he employed so successfully a few years ago. Rather more successful as a musician than as a romantic actor, he displays his versatility by playing almost every instrument in his jazz orchestra with skill. The story concerns two rival band leaders, Mr. Rogers and June Clyde, who meet under amusing if rather shopworn circumstances...The music, except for an excellent number called the Valparaiso, is commonplace."

References

External links

1935 films
British musical comedy films
1935 musical comedy films
1930s English-language films
Films directed by Marcel Varnel
British black-and-white films
Films shot at Welwyn Studios
1930s British films